Maria Sophia Elisabeth of Neuburg (6 August 1666 – 4 August 1699) was Queen of Portugal as the wife of King Peter II from 1687 until her death in 1699. A popular queen, she was noted for her extraordinary generosity and for being the mother of the famously extravagant John V of Portugal.

Life
Maria Sophia was born at the Schloss Benrath outside Düsseldorf in the Holy Roman Empire what is now Germany. Her father Philip William was the reigning Count Palatine of Neuburg. In 1685 he became Elector Palatine following the death of his cousin Charles II, an inheritance that greatly increased the family's status within Europe. In December 1676, Maria Sophia's sister Eleonore Magdalene was married to Holy Roman Emperor Leopold I owing to the family's reputation as producing fertile women. After two marriages, Leopold had no living male heirs. The new Empress Eleonore Magdalene fulfilled her function and quickly mothered two future Holy Roman Emperors (Joseph I and Charles VI).

A similar succession crisis was occurring in Portugal. Isabel Luísa, Princess of Beira, heiress to the throne and only daughter of King Peter II, was childless and had been refused by most European sovereigns due to her sickly nature and strict Portuguese succession rights. As a result, the Portuguese ambassador Manuel da Silva Teles was sent to Heidelberg to ask for the hand of Maria Sophia, with the encouragement of Empress Eleonore Magdalene. The embassy left Lisbon on 8 December 1686 and the marriage contract was signed on 22 May 1687. A dowry of 100,000 florins was agreed on.

Queen

Following her proxy marriage on 2 July 1687 in Heidelberg, Maria Sophia left her native Germany the following August. She travelled up the Rhine to receive the honours of all courts along the river. At Brila, Maria Sophia embarked on an English yacht that was put at her disposal by order of James II of England. She was accompanied by an English fleet that travelled to Plymouth with the Duke of Grafton, son of the late Charles II of England. The new queen arrived in Lisbon 12 August 1687 amid great celebration and the same day the couple was formally married by the Archbishop of Lisbon at Ribeira Palace. Supposedly Louis XIV was "greatly chagrined" by Peter's decision to marry a daughter of the Elector Palatine and not a French princess, as he had hoped.

The young queen quickly gained the affection of her stepdaughter Isabel Luísa, who was herself less than three years younger than Maria Sophia. She was also loved by her husband, who was quickly presented with a son the year after his marriage. The son survived only three weeks, but a year later, Maria Sophia had another son who would succeed his father as John V of Portugal. As an adult, he would marry his first cousin Maria Anna of Austria, daughter of Empress Eleonore Magdalene.

Maria Sophia was described as gentle, and Peter reportedly treated her with respect. While she clashed with her widowed sister-in-law Catherine of Braganza on matters of etiquette, she was described as a popular queen who was decidedly generous and set about helping the poor of Lisbon. Her pious nature also made her a popular queen. She was frequently involved with charities that supported widows and orphans and allowed poor patients access to medical care at the royal palace. She had a very intimate friendship with Father Bartolomeu do Quental, who died with the reputation of a saint. In Beja, she financed the foundation of a Franciscan school. She died in Lisbon of fever, possibly a symptom of erysipelas, on 4 August 1699, two days before her thirty-third birthday. Her body was laid to rest at the Monastery of São Vicente de Fora in Lisbon.

Issue

Ancestry

References

Publications

 Triumpho Lusitano, applausos festivos, sumptuosidades regias nos augustissimos desposorios do inclito D. Pedro II com a serenissima Maria Sofia Izabel de Baviera, monarchas de Portugal, por Manuel de Leão; Bruxelas, 1688;
 Heptaphonon, ou portico de sete vozes, consagrado à magestade defunta da senhora D. Maria Sophia Izabel de Neuburgo, por Pascoal Ribeiro Coutinho, Lisboa, 1699;
 Sermão das exequias da Serenissima Rainha Nossa Senhora D. Maria Sophia Izabel, prégado na Villa de Santo Amaro das Grotas do Rio de Sergipe, por Frei António da Piedade, Lisboa, 1703;
 Sentimento lamentavel, que a dor mais sentida em lagrimas tributa na intempestiva morte da Serenissima Rainha de Portugal D. Maria Sophia Izabel e Neuburgo, por Bernardino Botelho de Oliveira, Lisboa, 1699;
 Oração funebre nas exequias da Rainha D. Maria Sophia Izabel, celebradas na Real Casa da Misericordia de Lisboa, por D. Diogo da Anunciação Justiniano, Lisboa, 1699.
Stephens, Henry Morse. Portugal. Putnam, 1903. The Story of the Nations. Google Books. Web. 27 May 2010. <https://books.google.com/books?id=uAQqAAAAYAAJ>.
Thomson, Mark Alméras., Ragnhild Marie Hatton, and J. S. Bromley. William III and Louis XIV: Essays 1680-1720. Toronto: University of Toronto, 1968. Google Books. Web.

External links 

 Genealogy of the House of Braganza

1666 births
1699 deaths
Burials at the Monastery of São Vicente de Fora
House of Braganza
Countesses Palatine of Neuburg
House of Wittelsbach
Nobility from Düsseldorf
Portuguese queens consort
Infectious disease deaths in Portugal
17th-century Portuguese people
17th-century Portuguese women
Daughters of monarchs